Linda Timberlake Foster (February 8, 1943 – February 26, 2016) is an American politician who served multiple terms in the New Hampshire House of Representatives, retiring as Deputy Speaker in 2010.

A member of the Democratic Party, she was first elected in 1992 but lost her seat following redistricting in 2002. She ran again in 2004 and served another three terms.

References

External links

Democratic Party members of the New Hampshire House of Representatives
1943 births
2016 deaths
University of Maine alumni
Women state legislators in New Hampshire
20th-century American politicians
21st-century American politicians
Politicians from Portland, Maine
21st-century American women politicians
20th-century American women politicians